Nichiji (日持; February 10, 1250 – after 1304), also known as Kaikō, was a Buddhist disciple of Nichiren who traveled to Hokkaido, Siberia, and China.

Nichiji was born in Suruga Province, the second child of a large and powerful family. At first he studied to become a Tendai priest but soon he joined Nichiren as one of his initial followers.

Nichiji was one of the "six chosen disciples" of Nichiren, but was also a disciple of Nikkō. After Nichiren died in 1282, Nichiji established Eishō-ji, now Ren'ei-ji (蓮永寺) in Shizuoka. But soon, relations with Nikkō became strained. He set out on a missionary journey on January 1, 1295. His plan was to walk to Hakodate, Hokkaidō and from there proceed to Xanadu in order to convert the Mongols. 

For many centuries it was unknown what happened to Nichiji after he left Japan. In 1936, though, a Japanese tourist discovered his gohonzon and relics in a remote region of China, and in 1989 these relics were carbon dated and determined by Tokyo University researchers to be most probably authentic. Thanks to his inscriptions on the relics, it is now known that he landed in China in 1298, met some Western Xia Buddhists on the road and decided on their advice to settle in Xuanhua District instead of Xanadu. In Xuanhua, he founded Lìhuà Temple (立化寺塔; Japanese: Rikka-ji)., and a few Chinese residents converted to Nichiren Buddhism under his tutelage, including an old man named Nishote whom he mentions as his chief disciple. He died sometime after 1304.

In Nichiren Shū Nichiji is regarded as a patron saint of foreign missionaries.

References

Further reading 
 Li Narangoa. Japanische Religionspolitik in der Mongolei 1932-1945. Reformbestrebungen und Dialog zwischen japanischem und mongolischem Buddhismus. Wiesbaden: Harrassowitz, 1998.
 Montgomery, Daniel (1991). Fire in the Lotus, The Dynamic Religion of Nichiren, London: Mandala, 
 前嶋 信次 . "日持上人の大陸渡航について―宣化出土遺物を中心として "

External links 

 Treasures of Senka - documentary in English
  Hakodate News
 日持上人開教の事跡－津軽十三湊をめぐって－". Nichiren Buddhism Modern Religious Institute.
 劇画宗門史「日持上人」 
 "Modern Japanese Buddhism and Pan-Asianism"

1250 births
1300s deaths
Japanese Buddhist clergy
Nichiren-shū Buddhist monks
Kamakura period Buddhist clergy